James Howden Ganley (born 24 December 1941 in Hamilton) is a former racing driver from New Zealand. From 1971 to 1974 he participated in 41 World Championship Formula One Grands Prix. He placed 4th twice and scored points 5 times for a total of 10 championship points (only the top 6 places scored points). He also participated in numerous non-Championship Formula One races.

Personal and early life 
When he was thirteen years old, he attended the 1955 New Zealand Grand Prix at Ardmore which inspired him and provided him with an impetus to follow a career in racing. Immediately after leaving school, Ganley became a reporter for the Waikato Times and wrote a column for Sports Car Illustrated. He moved to the United Kingdom in 1961 and pursued a career as a mechanic.

Career

Early career 
Between 1960 and 1962, Ganley competed in many events throughout New Zealand driving a Lotus Eleven. Throughout this period, he was earning a living by working as a foreman for a concreting company.

In 1970, Ganley finished second to Peter Gethin in the European Formula 5000 championship. This caught the attention of the BRM Formula One team, who signed him to a contract for 1971.

Formula 5000 

In 1970, Ganley finished the European Formula 5000 Championship in 2nd place with help from his friend and mechanic Barry Ultahan.

Formula One 
In , Ganley started off the season promisingly with fifth place at the non-championship Race of Champions. At the end of 1971, having scored two points finishes during the year, Ganley was awarded the Wolfgang von Trips Memorial Trophy for the best performance by a newcomer to Grand Prix racing.
In  Ganley raced for the Marlboro BRM team and finished 13th in the Championship with 4 points. His highest finish for the season was 4th at the Nürburgring. For the  season Ganley signed up to drive an Iso–Marlboro car for Frank Williams Racing. At the 1973 Canadian Grand Prix he was almost declared the winner because of a timing mix up with the pace car; when the results were corrected, Ganley was classified sixth.

A suspension failure in practice for the 1974 German Grand Prix while driving for the Maki team left Ganley with serious foot and ankle injuries that ended his Grand Prix career.

Ganley F1 Car 
In 1975 a Ganley F1 project was initiated. The Ganley-Cosworth 001 car was hand-built by Howden Ganley on his premises at Windsor. It was almost readied, and Ganley had two DFV engines at hand, but it never ran in anger. Ganley eventually used the equipment to start Tiga Race Cars with fellow driver Tim Schenken the following year.

Sportscars 
Ganley and François Cevert drove a Matra-Simca MS670 to second place in the 1972 24 Hours of Le Mans.

Tiga Race Cars 

In 1976 Ganley and former Formula One driver Australian Tim Schenken founded Tiga Race Cars as a British-based race car constructor and race team. The team had plans to compete in Formula One in 1978, but the project did not proceed due to sponsorship withdrawal.

Complete Formula One World Championship results 
(key) (Races in bold indicate pole position)

Complete 24 Hours of Le Mans results

Footnotes 

New Zealand Formula One drivers
New Zealand racing drivers
1941 births
Living people
24 Hours of Le Mans drivers
Sportspeople from Hamilton, New Zealand
BRM Formula One drivers
Williams Formula One drivers
March Formula One drivers
Maki Formula One drivers
World Sportscar Championship drivers